Lauren Halsey (b. 1987 Los, Angeles, California) is a contemporary American artist. Halsey uses architecture and installation art to demonstrate the realities of urban neighborhoods like South Central, Los Angeles.

Biography 
Halsey was born in 1987 in Los Angeles, California. She studied at the California Institute of the Arts (CalArts) from 2008-2012, earning a BFA, and then Yale University from 2012-2014, earning an MFA.

From 2012-2014, Halsey worked with colleagues on a project titled Harlem Postcards, which was presented at The Studio Museum in Harlem, NY. It was during this time. that Halsey completed her thesis exhibition at the California Institute of the Arts and began the program at Yale University.  In 2015 Halsey was included in the United, exhibition at Coney Island Art Walls. The same year she was included in the exhibition  Everything, Everyday at the Studio Museum along with fellow Artists -in-Residence Sadie Barnette (also a CalArts alum) and Eric Mack.

In 2018 Halsey was involved in a solo exhibition at Foundation Louis Vuitton, Paris. Also in 2018, she participated in a solo exhibition at the Museum of Contemporary Art (MOCA). Her work was at the Hammer Museum. New to the L.A. art scene, Halsey was awarded the Mohn Award in 2018. She won the Frieze Artist Award in 2019.

Halsey was included in the 2019 traveling exhibition Young, Gifted, and Black: The Lumpkin-Boccuzzi Family Collection of Contemporary Art.

In July 2020, Halsey collaborated with Korina Matyas, a childhood friend and environmentalist to start Summaeverythang, an initiative to bring organic produce to underserved neighborhoods in L.A. Summaeverythang donated an average of 600 boxes of organic produce every week throughout the 2020 season.

Awards 
California Institute of Arts awarded Lauren Halsey The Beutner Family Award of Excellence in the Arts in 2011. Halsey was awarded the Skowhegan School of Painting and Sculpture scholarship for emerging artist in 2014. In 2014-15, Halsey was part of the Studio Museum in Harlems Artist-in-Residence program. She was recognized for transforming the Mezzanine Gallery with a site-specific installation for her exhibition titled Everything, Everyday. Halsey is the recipient of the Rema Hort Mann Foundation Emerging Artist grant, 2015. She received the William H. Johnson Price in 2017. Also in 2017, she was awarded the Edge Award from the Los Angeles Design Festival. In 2018, Halsey received $100,000 for the Mohn Award to honor her artistic excellence. In 2019, Lauren Halsey was named the winner of the Frieze Art, for which she will receive $25,000, funded by Luma Foundation, to create a new work for the upcoming edition of Frieze New York art fair. Also in 2019, Halsey was  recipient of the 2019 Painter and Sculptors Grant from the Joan Mitchell Foundation, New York. In 2021 Halsey received the Gwendolyn Knight | Jacob Lawrence Prize from the Seattle Art Museum.

References

External links
 Official website
 images of Halsey's work at the Joan Mitchell Foundation

American installation artists
Living people
1987 births
American women installation artists
Artists from Los Angeles
21st-century American women artists
21st-century African-American women
21st-century African-American artists
African-American contemporary artists
American contemporary artists
African-American women artists
California Institute of the Arts alumni
Yale University alumni
20th-century African-American people
20th-century African-American women